Deceit is the propagation of beliefs that are not true.

Deceit may also refer to:

Books
Deceit, c.1920 book of cartoons by Harry Furniss
Deceit (1993, by Peter Darvill-Evans), the eighth of the Virgin New Adventures series of Doctor Who novels
Deceit, 1993 novel by Clare Francis
Deceit, 2006 novel by James Siegel

Film and television 
 Deceit (1923 film), a drama directed by Oscar Micheaux
 Deceit (1932 film), a drama directed by Albert Ray
 Deceit (1952 film), an Italian drama film directed by Guido Brignone
 Deceit, the first working title of Family Plot, a 1976 detective film directed by Alfred Hitchcock
 Deceit (1989 film), a science fiction film directed by Albert Pyun
 Deceit (1999 film), an Italian mystery film
 Deceit (2004 film), a crime drama directed by John Sacret Young
 Deceit, a 2006 film with Matt Long
 Deceit (2009 film), a short film by Gary Brockette
 Deceit (2017 film), the UK title of US film Where Is Kyra? directed by Andrew Dosunmu
 Deceit (2000 miniseries), a mystery television serial
 Deceit (2021 miniseries), a drama about a 1992 police honeytrap operation in the UK

Games
 Deceit, a game released in 2017

Music
 Deceit (album), a 1981 album by This Heat
 "Deceit", song by Suffocation from Souls to Deny 2004

Other uses 
 Deceit (horse), a racehorse
 Tort of deceit, a type of legal injury
 Deceit, an island and an islet in the Hermite Islands archipelago

See also
 Cape Deceit